De Afwezige  is a 1913 Dutch silent drama film directed by Albert Capellani. It was released on 2 May 1913.

Plot

Dries, a farmer and a widower, lives with his mother-in-law Grietje and his son Peter. He falls in love with Minna, a widow, and marries her despite the opposition of his family and friends. In anger his son Peter leaves home to enlist, while Grietje takes up her residence in another cottage. Six years pass, during which Grietje becomes acquainted with Minna's daughter Dina (en bemiddelt tussen de twee families). Peter falls ill in Sumatra, but after falling in love with Dina, through the medium of photographs, he recovers and is drafted home again to Holland. He meets Dina and the two find that they truly love. Minna now sets herself to bring about general reunion, and this she eventually succeeds in doing.

Cast

 Henri Étiévant as Dries Schoonejans
 Henri Rollan as Peter Schoonejans
 Jeanne Grumbach as Schoonmoeder Grietje/Mother-in-law Grietje
 Germaine Dermoz as Minna Petrus
 Raymonde Dupré as Dina
 Henri Collen

References

External links 
 

1913 films
Dutch black-and-white films
1913 drama films
Films directed by Albert Capellani
Dutch silent feature films
Dutch drama films
Silent drama films